Ramón da Silva Costa (born February 27, 1992, in Rio de Janeiro, Brazil) is a professional Brazilian footballer who currently plays for Cafetaleros de Tapachula.

References

External links
 

Living people
1992 births
Association football forwards
Nova Iguaçu Futebol Clube players
Cafetaleros de Chiapas footballers
Sociedade Esportiva e Recreativa Caxias do Sul players
Clube Atlético Juventus players
Campeonato Brasileiro Série D players
Ascenso MX players
Malaysia Super League players
Brazilian expatriate footballers
Brazilian expatriate sportspeople in Mexico
Brazilian expatriate sportspeople in Malaysia
Expatriate footballers in Mexico
Expatriate footballers in Malaysia
Footballers from Rio de Janeiro (city)
Brazilian footballers